Jan Bert Lieve Vertonghen (born 24 April 1987) is a Belgian professional footballer who plays for Pro League club Anderlecht and captains the Belgium national team. Mainly a central defender, he can also play as a left-back.

Vertonghen began his senior career at Dutch club Ajax in 2006 and totalled 220 games and 28 goals for them across all competitions, serving as their captain from 2011 to 2012. He won two Eredivisie and two KNVB Cup titles during his time at the club, and in 2012 he was named Dutch Footballer of the Year. Vertonghen transferred to Tottenham Hotspur in July 2012, and made the PFA Team of the Year in his first Premier League season. He made 315 appearances for Spurs over eight years, and won their player of the year award in 2018.

Vertonghen made his international debut for Belgium in 2007 and his 145 caps (including three unofficial games, according to FIFA rules) are the most in the history of the national team. He was part of Belgian squads that came fourth at the 2008 Olympics, finishing third at the 2018 FIFA World Cup, and the round of 16 at Euro 2020.

Early life
Vertonghen was born in Sint-Niklaas, Belgium, to Ria Mattheeuws and Paul Vertonghen. He has two brothers, Ward and Lode; both have played football.

Club career

Ajax

After spending time at VK Tielrode and Germinal Beerschot, Vertonghen moved to the Netherlands and signed a contract with the youth academy of Eredivisie side AFC Ajax. He began as a midfielder but then became a regular at centre-back for Ajax. During his time in the reserves, he became known for an incident in a 2006 KNVB Cup game against Cambuur Leeuwarden, his first home game at the Amsterdam Arena, where he scored a goal to put Ajax 3–0 up. He had attempted a back pass to the Cambuur goalkeeper while a teammate was receiving treatment but instead the ball went into the goal. Since it was unintentional, Ajax allowed Cambuur to score a goal in return. On 23 August 2006, Vertonghen made his first team debut in the Champions League third qualifying round against Copenhagen. He made his first start and Eredivisie debut in a 6–0 win over Willem II at the Amsterdam Arena and would play another two matches for the first half of the season.

Loan to RKC
After the winter break of the 2006–07 season, he was sent on loan to struggling RKC Waalwijk for the remainder of the season. At RKC, he would play 12 matches in which he scored three times, but he was unable to help the team avoid relegation to the Eerste Divisie. One of his goals with RKC Waalwijk was against his parent club, Ajax, in a 2–2 draw, which eventually let Ajax finish second in the league on only one goal difference with PSV.

Breakthrough at Ajax

Vertonghen returned to Ajax for the 2007–08 season, where he was tipped for stardom, but was unable to break through due to a severe injury and the presence of central defenders John Heitinga and Thomas Vermaelen. Johan Cruyff had made no secret of his admiration for the left-footed youngster who can handle any left-sided position in defence and midfield, opting, on 26 September 2008, to extend his contract to 30 June 2013.

The 2008–09 season was a breakthrough season for the young defender. After John Heitinga left for Atlético Madrid, Vertonghen became Thomas Vermaelen's first-choice partner in central defence; the former started 23 of the 26 games he played in and scored four goals. On 28 September, he scored a rare double against Vitesse in a 3–0 win. Although sustaining an injury from training during the week, he played in the match against Groningen on 24 January, billed as a "must-win" match by coach Marco van Basten; Vertonghen was unfortunate enough to be sent off for two yellow cards as Ajax lost 1–0. He was out for a month after sustaining a hamstring injury in an away win on 1 March against Utrecht, but his return lasted only several games after his season was prematurely ended after aggravating another injury.

Rising importance under Jol
Under new coach Martin Jol, Vertonghen retained his place in the starting line-up for the 2009–10 season. Despite injuring his toe while on international duty against Spain the previous week, he scored his first goal of the season, a free kick, in a 6–0 thrashing of NAC Breda on 13 September. With the departure of Thomas Vermaelen to Arsenal, he and fellow Belgian Toby Alderweireld become the first choice centre-back pairing and soon became a firm fans' favourite. Despite Ajax's erratic form in the latter weeks leading up to the winter break, he turned in some strong performances and attracted the interest of a number of clubs, including Barcelona, but he played down the rumours, stating his intent to at least see out his contract with Ajax.

After the winter break, Ajax went on a nine-game unbeaten streak in the league, with Vertonghen playing a key role. Their run of six consecutive clean sheets was ended in a 4–1 home win over PSV when the visiting side were awarded a penalty. Vertonghen was linked with a move to Newcastle United, and later he was also linked with Milan, stating, "I've heard Milan Director Adriano Galliani talk about me after the Champions League match in San Siro and his words were very flattering."

Vertonghen stated on numerous occasions late in the 2010–11 season that he was considering leaving Ajax at the end of that season. In May 2011, Frank de Boer confirmed Manchester City boss Roberto Mancini was present at the 2011 KNVB Cup Final held on 7 May 2011, where Vertonghen's side lost 3–2 to Twente. Mancini was reportedly scouting Vertonghen to strengthen his side after they had qualified for the UEFA Champions League 2011–12 campaign.

Breakthrough under De Boer

During the 2011–12 Eredivisie season, Vertonghen emerged as one of Ajax's best players, demonstrating his versatility to cover multiple positions after Ajax had let several regular players out on long-term loans. After an impressive season, including a performance for which he was singled out for praise against Manchester United in the UEFA Europa League Round of 16, he was named the 2011–12 Eredivisie Player of the Year. Named team captain by Frank de Boer, he led his Ajax to their second title in a row, scoring eight goals in 31 league games, highlighting his attacking strengths. Also, for the second time, he dropped the Championship plate. "Now it falls on my toe – this plate just does not like me," Vertonghen said.

Tottenham Hotspur

2012–13 season
Throughout the 2011–12 season, Vertonghen was linked with English club Tottenham Hotspur and publicly expressed his desire to make the move to White Hart Lane ahead of numerous other teams. A key factor in this was his desire to play as a centre-back, with Arsenal wanting to use him as a defensive midfielder. On 8 July 2012, Tottenham agreed a fee and terms for Vertonghen subject to a medical. On 12 July, Tottenham announced that they had officially completed the signing of Vertonghen, for an amount around 12 million Euros, after he successfully completed his medical. Vertonghen took part in his first game as a Tottenham player in a 3–2 friendly win against Brentford on 14 July, then later scored his first goal for the club on 26 September in a 3–0 win against Carlisle United in the third round of the Football League Cup.

Vertonghen scored his first Premier League goal against Manchester United in a historic 2–3 win at Old Trafford, although this was later ruled to be an own goal by Jonny Evans. He scored in the league for Tottenham on 16 December, the only goal of the game, in a win at White Hart Lane against Swansea City. Vertonghen then scored a brace in a losing effort against Liverpool on 10 March. He was named Premier League Player of the Month for March 2013, making himself the second Belgian and the 12th Spurs player to win the award. On 11 April 2013, Vertonghen was sent-off against Basel during Tottenham's Europa League quarter-final second leg. Tottenham went on to lose the tie 4–1 on penalties after a 4–4 draw on aggregate. Vertonghen was named in the 2012–13 PFA Team of the Year, alongside Rio Ferdinand, Leighton Baines and Pablo Zabaleta in defence.

2013–14 season
During a League Cup match with Aston Villa in September, Villa striker Nicklas Helenius gained notoriety when Vertonghen pulled down his shorts while he shot on goal, which revealed his briefs. After an incident the following game with Chelsea which got Fernando Torres sent off, Chelsea coach José Mourinho thought that Vertonghen should not have been playing because of the Helenius incident which he said that Vertonghen left the striker "naked".

2014–15 season

At the start of the 2014–15 season, Vertonghen appeared to be out of favour with new manager Mauricio Pochettino. The Argentine gave Vertonghen limited games, preferring Younès Kaboul and Federico Fazio. However, Kaboul lost his place to Vertonghen, who formed an effective partnership with Fazio. Together, the pair, over the span of 15 games, celebrated 11 wins and only suffered one loss. Vertonghen helped Spurs to reach the 2015 League Cup Final and started the game on 1 March 2015, but Tottenham lost to rival club Chelsea at Wembley Stadium 2–0.

2015–16 season
Vertonghen was joined in defence by former Ajax teammate and compatriot Alderweireld at the start of the 2015–16 season. Over the first ten games of the season, Vertonghen and Alderweireld played ten out of the opening ten games together, with Spurs suffering only one loss during the span. In late January 2016, he damaged his medial knee-ligament and did not play for 11 weeks. He returned in the home match against Manchester United on 10 April 2016, which finished in a 3–0 win, the first home league win for Tottenham against Manchester United since 2001. His partnership with Alderweireld in the defence was recognised as being crucial for the club which had the joint-lowest number of goals conceded in the Premier League that season.

2016–17 season
On 2 December 2016, Vertonghen signed a new contract with Tottenham until 2019. However, in mid January 2017, Vertonghen suffered an ankle ligament injury that would see him out of action for five weeks. He returned to the team on 19 February in the fifth round FA Cup match against Fulham at Craven Cottage. This season, Vertonghen was part of the Tottenham defence that achieved the best defensive record for the club, with only 26 goals conceded in the Premier League (and only 9 conceded in home league games), 6 better than the previous record of 32 conceded that was set in the 1908–09 season in the Second Division. He was considered then one of the best defenders in the Premier League.

2017–18 season
On 7 January 2018, Vertonghen scored his first goal for the club since October 2013, a 30-yard strike in the 3–0 win over Wimbledon in the third round of the 2017–18 FA Cup. This season, he made 36 appearances out of the 38 Premier League games, as well six in the UEFA Champions League, and five in the cups.

2018–19 season
In the opening game of the 2018–19 season against Newcastle United, Vertonghen scored Tottenham's first goal of the season 8 minutes into the game, helping the team to a 2–1 win. However, he suffered a hamstring injury in the game against Huddersfield on 29 September, and was out for two months, returning to the starting lineup in the Champions League game against Inter Milan in late November. His contract with Tottenham was extended to 2020 in December 2018. In the last 16 round home game against Borussia Dortmund in the Champions League, Vertonghen played in the less familiar position of left wing back, scoring one goal and providing one assist in a game that finished 3–0. He received wide praise for his performance in this game, and he was named the Champions League Player of the Week by UEFA.

In the match against Ajax in the semifinal of the Champions League, he suffered a head injury after clashing his head with Toby Alderweireld. He returned to play in the leg in Amsterdam wearing a protective mask, and helped the team to a dramatic win against Ajax that sent Tottenham to their first Champions League final. Vertonghen later revealed that the collision left him with symptoms of concussion such as dizziness and headaches for nine months afterwards, which affected his performance in the following and final season with Tottenham.

2019–20 season
In the 2019–20 season, Vertonghen scored a late goal also as the winning goal, his first of the season, in the away game against Wolverhampton Wanderers to snatch a 2–1 win. On 26 December 2019, he made his 300th Tottenham appearance in a 2–1 home comeback win over Brighton & Hove Albion. Vertonghen's contract was originally set to expire on 30 June 2020, but was extended to the end of the 2019–20 campaign due to the stoppage related to COVID-19. He became a free agent after the club's last game of the season against Crystal Palace. Vertonghen did not appear in the match.

Benfica
On 14 August 2020, Benfica announced the signing of the 33-year old on a three-year deal. He made his debut on 15 September away to Greece's PAOK FC in the third qualifying round of the Champions League, a 2–1 loss in a one-leg match where he scored an own goal. Three days later he played for the first time in the Primeira Liga, a 5–1 win at F.C. Famalicão in the season opener. On 3 December 2020, Vertonghen scored his first goal for Benfica in a home match against Lech Poznan in the group stage of the Europa League.

Anderlecht
On 2 September 2022, Vertonghen signed with Belgian club Anderlecht on a free transfer, after he and Benfica agreed to the termination of his contract.

International career

Vertonghen made his international debut at the under-21 level in 2006 and played in the 2007 UEFA U21 Championships.

On 2 June 2007, he made his senior debut for the national team in a 2–1 home loss against Portugal in UEFA Euro 2008 qualification. At the end of the game he was fouled by substitute striker Hugo Almeida, who was sent off. Vertonghen was also selected for the 2008 Olympics and played in every match as the Belgians unexpectedly took fourth place.

In the 2010 World Cup qualifying, he began to establish himself as a regular, initially at centre-back as former Ajax teammate Thomas Vermaelen's partner. He scored the opening goal, also his first ever international goal, in an August 2009 friendly against the Czech Republic that ended in a 3–1 loss. On 7 September 2009, in a World Cup qualifying away match against Spain, he injured his toe and had to be stretchered off and substituted in the 29th minute. The match ended bad as well; a 5–0 loss. Now he usually plays as leftback as Vermaelen and Vincent Kompany are the preferred pairing in central defence. He was back in the starting eleven for the friendly against Hungary, a 3–0 win and the 1–0 loss to Croatia the following March.

On 13 May 2014, Vertonghen was named in Belgium's squad for the 2014 FIFA World Cup. In the team's opening match against Algeria, the African side was awarded a penalty after Vertonghen pulled down Sofiane Feghouli and received a yellow card. Feghouli scored for Algeria from the penalty spot, but Belgium came back to win 2–1. He was then replaced by Thomas Vermaelen in the starting line-up for the second match against Russia on 22 June. After 31 minutes, however, Vermaelen was taken off with an injury and replaced by Vertonghen. In the final group match, Vertonghen captained the team and scored the winning goal as Belgium beat South Korea 1–0.

Early in the 2014–15 season, Vertonghen knocked a child unconscious with a misplaced shot during a training session with the Belgian squad. In 2016, he injured two ligaments in his ankle in an accident while training before the quarter-final against Wales during UEFA Euro 2016, and as a result missed the match that Belgium lost.

Eleven years to the day on from his international début, against the same opposition (Portugal) Vertonghen won his 100th cap (the first in Belgian history), which was presented to him by his mother.

At the 2018 FIFA World Cup in Russia, Vertonghen initiated the scoring in Belgium's second-half comeback from a 0–2 deficit against Japan, heading from 20 yards out to the far post in a 3–2 comeback victory.

Career statistics

Club

International

As of match played 1 December 2022. Belgium score listed first, score column indicates score after each Vertonghen goal.

Honours
Ajax
Eredivisie: 2010–11, 2011–12
KNVB Cup: 2006–07, 2009–10

Tottenham Hotspur
Football League Cup runner-up: 2014–15
UEFA Champions League runner-up: 2018–19

Benfica
Taça de Portugal runner-up: 2020–21
Taça da Liga runner-up: 2021–22

Belgium
FIFA World Cup third place: 2018

Individual
Ajax Talent of the Year (Marco van Basten Award): 2007–08
Ajax Player of the Year (Rinus Michels Award): 2011–12
Dutch Footballer of the Year: 2012
AFC Ajax Club of 100: 2012
PFA Team of the Year: 2012–13 Premier League, 2017–18 Premier League
Premier League Player of the Month: March 2013
UEFA Champions League Squad of the Season: 2018–19
RBFA 125 Years All Star Team: 2020
IFFHS All Time Belgium Dream Team: 2021

See also
List of men's footballers with 100 or more international caps

References

External links

1987 births
Living people
Sportspeople from Sint-Niklaas
Footballers from East Flanders
Belgian footballers
Association football defenders
Association football midfielders
AFC Ajax players
RKC Waalwijk players
Beerschot A.C. players
Tottenham Hotspur F.C. players
S.L. Benfica footballers
R.S.C. Anderlecht players
Eredivisie players
Premier League players
Primeira Liga players
Belgian Pro League players
Olympic footballers of Belgium
Footballers at the 2008 Summer Olympics
Belgium youth international footballers
Belgium under-21 international footballers
Belgium international footballers
2014 FIFA World Cup players
UEFA Euro 2016 players
2018 FIFA World Cup players
UEFA Euro 2020 players
2022 FIFA World Cup players
FIFA Century Club
Belgian expatriate footballers
Belgian expatriate sportspeople in the Netherlands
Belgian expatriate sportspeople in England
Belgian expatriate sportspeople in Portugal
Expatriate footballers in the Netherlands
Expatriate footballers in England
Expatriate footballers in Portugal